Pendergast v Attorney-General (1998) 3 NZ ConvC 192,729 is a cited case in New Zealand regarding the availability of rectification if a unilateral mistake exists.

Background
Pendergast had a perpetual renewable lease with a Domain Board. During a rent renewal, a new lease agreement was prepared. Unbeknown to Pendergast, the Domain Board hid a clause giving it a right to cancel the lease.

Pendergast signed the new lease since he thought that just the rental had been changed.

Decision
Pendergast's claim for rectification succeeded. Penlington J said, "This aspect of the law relating to rectification is based on the equitable principle of fair dealing between the parties".

References

Court of Appeal of New Zealand cases
New Zealand contract case law
1998 in New Zealand law
1998 in case law